Ring Ding Dong may refer to:

"Keep Their Heads Ringin'", 1995 single by American rapper Dr. Dre
"Ring Ding Dong" (Shinee song), 2009 song by South Korean group Shinee

See also
 "Ring a Ding Dong", a 2010 song by Kaela Kimura
 Ring-a-Ding-Ding!, a 1961 album by Frank Sinatra
 "Ring-dinge-ding", a song by Thérèse Steinmetz, the Dutch entry in the Eurovision Song Contest 1967